The Pintwater Range is a mountain range in Churchill and Lincoln counties, in the U.S. state of Nevada.

Pintwater Range was figuratively named due to a lack of water.

References 

Mountain ranges of Churchill County, Nevada
Mountain ranges of Lincoln County, Nevada
Mountain ranges of Nevada